Scotch Hill may refer to:

Scotch Hill, Pennsylvania, a community in Clarion County, Pennsylvania
Scotch Hill, West Virginia, an unincorporated community in Preston County